Minor Mishaps is a 2002 Danish film.  It won a number of awards and nominations including the Blue Angel at the 2002 Berlin International Film Festival for director Annette K. Olesen and a nomination for European Discovery of the Year at the European Film Awards.

The film is set in Amager in Denmark.

Plot
Minor Mishaps is the story of a family's reaction to the untimely death of their matriarch, examining the effect of the tragedy on John, her husband, who is himself ill, his daughters, Marianne and Eva, and their friends and family. The film throws a spotlight on each of their lives as they confront the changed dynamic in the family and their own lives, with some surprises, revelations and false accusations occurring along the way.

Olesen developed the film in collaboration with the actors, following the style of Mike Leigh.

References

External links
 
 
 Olesen Makes An Ambitious Debut
 Montreal Mirror: Film: Minor Mishaps

2002 films
2002 comedy-drama films
2000s Danish-language films
Danish comedy-drama films